Albert Percival Rowe, CBE (23 March 1898 – 25 May 1976), often known as Jimmy Rowe or A. P. Rowe, was a radar pioneer and university vice-chancellor. A British physicist and senior research administrator, he played a major role in the development of radar before and during World War II.

Early years
Rowe was born in Launceston, Cornwall, and after attending the Portsmouth Naval Dockyard School, he studied physics at the Royal College of Science, University of London, graduating with a first-class honours in 1921, and postgraduate diploma in air navigation in 1922. On 18 June 1932 at Beckenham, Kent, he married Mary Gordon Mathews, a solicitor.

Air defence and radar
In the Air Ministry he read up everything he could find on the art of air defence, and became alarmed. Working at that time for Harry Wimperis, he wrote a memo to him that concluded that "we were likely to lose the war if it starts within the next ten years". Wimperis took the report seriously, and in 1934 started the formation of what later became known as the Tizard Committee, which supported the early development of radio-based detection.

In 1935, Rowe coined the acronym RDF as a cover for the work, meaning Range and Direction Finding but suggesting the already well-known Radio Directing Finding technology. Rowe replaced Robert Watson-Watt as Superintendent of the Bawdsey Research Station where the Chain Home RDF system was developed, and in 1938–1945 was the Chief Superintendent of the Telecommunications Research Establishment (TRE), which carried out pioneering research on microwave radar. He was appointed a CBE in 1942.

E. H. Putley describes Rowe as a complex character with a strong sense of mission, so, difficult to live with. However, Putley supports Rowe's decisions in giving priority, and most of TRE's resources, to the completion of the Chain Home and Chain Home Low systems in 1938–39, and also continuing research in 1940 on developing airborne interception (AI) radar and centimetric radar with the cavity magnetron.  Despite some opposition from Bomber Command who felt that the project would not produce large-scale results, Rowe, assisted by Alec Reeves, also led in the development of the Oboe navigation system and the H2S radar.

Vice-chancellor
In 1946 Rowe moved to Australia as chief scientific officer for the British rocket programme. The following year he was appointed scientific adviser to the Australian Department of Defence, and on 1 May 1948 he became, by invitation, the first full-time vice-chancellor of the University of Adelaide, a position he held until his retirement in 1958.

Retirement
He returned to England, living in Malvern, Worcestershire until his death on 25 May 1976. He was survived by his wife; they had no children.

References

Bibliography
Bowen, E. G.: Radar Days (1987, Inst. of Physics Publishing)
Lovell, Sir Bernard: Echoes of War; The Story of H2S Radar (1991, Adam Hilger)
Rowe, A. P.: One Story of Radar (1948, Cambridge U. Press)

Research administrators
1898 births
1976 deaths
Radar pioneers
British physicists
British operations researchers
People from Launceston, Cornwall
Alumni of Imperial College London
Academic staff of the University of Adelaide
Vice-Chancellors of the University of Adelaide
Commanders of the Order of the British Empire